Tambi is a village in the far east of Ivory Coast. It is in the sub-prefecture of Sorobango, Bondoukou Department, Gontougo Region, Zanzan District. Eight kilometres east of the village is a border crossing with Ghana.

Tambi was a commune until March 2012, when it became one of 1126 communes nationwide that were abolished.

Notes

Former communes of Ivory Coast
Populated places in Zanzan District
Ghana–Ivory Coast border crossings
Populated places in Gontougo